Microscopic traffic flow models are a class of scientific models of vehicular traffic dynamics.

In contrast, to macroscopic models, microscopic traffic flow models simulate single vehicle-driver units, so the dynamic variables of the models represent microscopic properties like the position and velocity of single vehicles.

Car-following models
Also known as time-continuous models, all car-following models have in common that they are defined by ordinary differential equations describing the complete dynamics of the vehicles' positions  and velocities . It is assumed that the input stimuli of the drivers are restricted to their own velocity , the net distance (bumper-to-bumper distance)  to the leading vehicle  (where  denotes the vehicle length), and the velocity  of the leading vehicle. The equation of motion of each vehicle is characterized by an acceleration function that depends on those input stimuli:

In general, the driving behavior of a single driver-vehicle unit  might not merely depend on the immediate leader  but on the  vehicles in front. The equation of motion in this more generalized form reads:

Examples of car-following models
 Optimal velocity model (OVM)
 Velocity difference model (VDIFF)
 Wiedemann model (1974)
 Gipps' model (Gipps, 1981)
 Intelligent driver model (IDM, 1999)
 DNN based anticipatory driving model (DDS, 2021)

Cellular automaton models
Cellular automaton (CA) models use integer variables to describe the dynamical properties of the system. Each road section can either be occupied by a vehicle or empty and the dynamics are given by updated rules of the form:

The time scale is typically given by the reaction time of a human driver, . With  fixed, the length of the road sections determines the granularity of the model. At a complete standstill, the average road length occupied by one vehicle is approximately 7.5 meters. However, in such a model, the smallest possible acceleration would be  which is unrealistic.

Although cellular automaton models lack the accuracy of the time-continuous car-following models, they still have the ability to reproduce a wide range of traffic phenomena. Due to the simplicity of the models, they are numerically very efficient and can be used to simulate large road networks in real-time or even faster.

Examples of CA models
 Rule 184
 Biham–Middleton–Levine traffic model
 Nagel–Schreckenberg model (NaSch, 1992)

See also
Microsimulation

References

Road traffic management
Mathematical modeling
Traffic flow